= Phenelfamycin E =

Names
- Other names LL-E 19020, Ganefromycin-α

Identifiers
CAS Number	114451-31-9
3D model (JSmol)	Interactive image
ChemSpider	34984771
PubChem CID	90478442
UNII	4PU25GRT71
- InChI: InChI=1S/C65H95NO21/c1-13-14-18-29-51-64(7,8)61(72)62(84-53(70)32-43-26-19-17-20-27-43)65(74,87-51)44(63(73)66-31-24-23-25-38(2)58(78-12)39(3)47-33-45(67)46(83-47)28-21-15-16-22-30-52(68)69)37-79-54-35-49(76-10)59(41(5)81-54)86-56-36-50(77-11)60(42(6)82-56)85-55-34-48(75-9)57(71)40(4)80-55/h13-30,39-42,44-51,54-62,67,71-72,74H,31-37H2,1-12H3,(H,66,73)(H,68,69)/b14-13-,16-15+,24-23+,28-21+,29-18+,30-22+,38-25+/t39-,40-,41-,42-,44+,45-,46-,47+,48-,49-,50+,51-,54+,55-,56+,57+,58+,59+,60-,61-,62+,65+/m0/s1; Key: UDVVGDCMWCVRCO-WOPDTIQPSA-N
- SMILES: C/C=C\C=C\[C@H]1C([C@H]([C@H]([C@](O1)([C@H](CO[C@H]2C[C@@H]([C@@H]([C@@H](O2)C)O[C@@H]3C[C@H]([C@H]([C@@H](O3)C)O[C@H]4C[C@@H]([C@@H]([C@@H](O4)C)O)OC)OC)OC)C(=O)NC/C=C/C=C(\C)/[C@H]([C@@H](C)[C@H]5C[C@@H]([C@@H](O5)/C=C/C=C/C=C/C(=O)O)O)OC)O)OC(=O)CC6=CC=CC=C6)O)(C)C

Properties
Chemical formula	C_{65}H_{95}NO_{21}
Molar mass	1226.461 g·mol^{−1}
- Except where otherwise noted, data are given for materials in their standard state (at 25 °C [77 °F], 100 kPa). Infobox references

Phenelfamycin E is an elfamycin-type antibiotic with the molecular formula C_{65}H_{95}ON_{21}. Phenelfamycin E is only used for research Phenelfamycin E is produced by Streptomyces bacteria.
